Monstress may refer to:

Monstress (character), a comics superheroine
Monstress (comics), a 2015 comics series by Marjorie Liu and Sana Takeda
Monstress (short story collection), a 2012 collection by Lysley Tenorio